Mateusz Kowalczyk and Igor Zelenay were the defending champions but chose to participate with different partners. Kowalczyk partnered Tomasz Bednarek while Zelenay partnered Rameez Junaid. Both failed to defend their title, with Kowalczyk losing to Zelenay in the first round and Zelenay losing to Sander Arends and Tristan-Samuel Weissborn in the quarterfinals.

Sander Arends and Tristan-Samuel Weissborn won the title after defeating Nikola Mektić and Antonio Šančić 6–3, 6–4 in the final.

Seeds

Draw

References
 Main Draw
 Qualifying Draw

Heilbronner Neckarcup - Doubles